Fort Cameron was a United States Military installation, located east of Beaver, Utah.

History
The fort opened in 1872 and was active for 11 years until 1883. The fort was originally established to protect settlers of Central Utah from local American Indians and to keep an eye on supposed Mormon rebellions. After the fort was decommissioned the buildings were sold to two locals, John R. Murdock and Philo T. Farnsworth, who helped organize the Beaver Branch of Brigham Young Academy (now Brigham Young University). After the Utah State Legislature passed a law requiring counties to offer tuition-free schools, the LDS Church closed the school and sold the property. All but one of the fort's buildings were razed, and most of the property is now a golf course.

See also

 National Register of Historic Places listings in Beaver County, Utah
 Utah War

References

Cameron
Buildings and structures in Beaver County, Utah
Formerly Used Defense Sites in Utah
Utah Territory
1872 establishments in Utah Territory
Cameron
National Register of Historic Places in Beaver County, Utah